Rainbow High is a fashion doll franchise created by Michael Scott Anderson originally as Rainbow Surprise and released by American toy company MGA Entertainment in 2020 originally as a spin-off from their Poopsie Slime Surprise brand. The back story for the franchise revolves around an elite high school for visual arts, featuring students who represent colors of the rainbow.

At the close of 2020, the brand got independent from other MGA brands and got complemented with an audiovisual franchise of in-universe-branded web series of computer-animated shorts and episodes which were predominantly released on YouTube and later made available on Netflix. In February 2022, MGA released the franchise's first official spin-off known as Shadow High to be the brand's rival school, with the spin-off brand spotting/representing grayscale colors in clear contrast to their hosts.

History

In 2019, MGA released a line of 14-inch fashion dolls under their Poopsie brand, named Rainbow Surprise. Though these dolls bear some resemblance to the eventual Rainbow High dolls, they are scaled up and have painted eyes rather than inset eyes. These four dolls were later re-released the following year under the Rainbow High brand in new packaging. Rainbow Surprise also included a series of blind-boxed Fantasy Friends dolls which were also incorporated into the Rainbow High brand.

The first 11-inch Rainbow High dolls were released in 2020, with the initial lineup including Ruby Anderson, Poppy Rowan, Sunny Madison, Jade Hunter, Skyler Bradshaw and Violet Willow dolls. Each of the original dolls included two outfits and a doll stand, while the dolls themselves featured inset eyes and thirteen points of articulation.

Web series
A web series of computer-animated shorts was announced  following the release of the first dolls. The series is produced by Australian animation studio Pixel Zoo with the financial backing from the Screen Queensland initiative of the Queensland Government with the first episode premiering on October 2, 2020 and additional episodes releasing at least every fortnight. The web series was complemented with spin-offs premiering every other week; looking at the activities and adventures of Rainbow High in the eyes of Violet Willow with her show, "The Vi Life" (pronounced "vie life"), and Karma Nichols with her show, "Kontent with Karma" with the latter debuting on 16 April 2021. 

The web series concluded its first season on 11 June 2021 The second season premiered on 16 July 2021 and concluded on 28 January 2022, with the third season featuring the rival school, "Shadow High", beginning 2 months later on 25 March, and concluded 23 November of that same year.

Reception
Following their release in mid-2020, the doll franchise appeared on multiple hot-toy lists including Toys "R" Us Canada and The Toy Insider, while The NPD Group reported in August 2020 that, Rainbow High was the No. 3 best selling fashion doll line and the No. 7 best selling doll line overall in the U.S.

References

External links

Official collectibles website

MGA Entertainment brands
Fashion dolls
2020s toys
Doll brands